The 2012 Christian Democratic Appeal leadership election was called to elect the new Leader of the Christian Democratic Appeal after incumbent Maxime Verhagen announced his retirement from national politics. Verhagen who had been the acting leader of the party since the resignation of Jan Peter Balkenende on 9 June 2010 did not stand for the leadership election. Sybrand van Haersma Buma the Parliamentary leader of the Christian Democratic Appeal in the House of Representatives beat the other candidates in the first round with 51.4% of the votes.

Background
For the Dutch general election of 2010, Balkenende, for a fourth time as Lijsttrekker, resigned his position as leader on 9 June 2010, taking political responsibility for the CDA's disappointing results in the election. He remained as Prime Minister until the new Rutte cabinet I was installed on 14 October 2010. After the formation of the 2010 Dutch cabinet, Maxime Verhagen the unofficial Deputy leader of the CDA, and Mark Rutte the Leader of the People's Party for Freedom and Democracy agreed on a coalition with the Party for Freedom (PVV). Verhagen became Deputy Prime Minister and Minister of Economic Affairs, Agriculture and Innovation in the Rutte cabinet I. Verhagen shared some of the party leadership with Ruth Peetoom, the Party chair and Sybrand van Haersma Buma, the Parliamentary leader of the Christian Democratic Appeal in the House of Representatives.

The coalition was a minority cabinet, but with the support of the Party for Freedom, it had a small majority in the House of Representatives of the Netherlands until 20 March 2012, the day Hero Brinkman left the PVV. Although Brinkman had stated he would continue supporting the minority cabinet as an independent politician, the PVV withdrew its support on 21 April 2012 after negotiations on new austerity measures collapsed. His withdrawal paved the way for early elections.

Candidates
Candidates were able to participate until 5 May 2012. The following CDA members announced their candidacy.

Results
On 18 May 2012 Sybrand van Haersma Buma got 51.4% of the votes, and a second round was not necessary.

Declined to run

The following people, who were speculated to be potential candidates for the leadership election but publicly denied interest, declared that they would not run, or decided to retire from politics.

 Maxime Verhagen
 Current: Minister of Economic Affairs, Agriculture and Innovation and Deputy Prime Minister
 Former: Minister of Foreign Affairs, Minister for Development Cooperation,  Parliamentary leader - House of Representatives, Member of the House of Representatives, Member of the European Parliament
 Jan Kees de Jager
 Current: Minister of Finance
 Former: State Secretary for Finance, Member of the House of Representatives
 Marja van Bijsterveldt
 Current: Minister of Education, Culture and Science
 Former: State Secretary for Education, Culture and Science, Member of the House of Representatives, Party chair, Mayor of Schipluiden
 Camiel Eurlings
 Former: Minister of Transport, Public Works and Water Management, Member of the House of Representatives, Member of the European Parliament
 Ab Klink
 Former: Minister of Health, Welfare and Sport, Member of the House of Representatives, Member of the Senate

References

External links
  Official site Christian Democratic Appeal

Christian Democratic Appeal
2012 elections in the Netherlands
Political party leadership elections in the Netherlands
Christian Democratic Appeal leadership election